Nelson Jamili (born 19 May 1959) is a Filipino boxer. He competed in the men's light flyweight event at the 1984 Summer Olympics. At the 1984 Summer Olympics, he lost to Marcelino Bolívar of Venezuela.

References

1959 births
Living people
Filipino male boxers
Olympic boxers of the Philippines
Boxers at the 1984 Summer Olympics
Place of birth missing (living people)
Southeast Asian Games medalists in boxing
Light-flyweight boxers
20th-century Filipino people